
Zielona Góra County is a unit of territorial administration and local government (powiat) in Lubusz Voivodeship, western Poland. It came into being on January 1, 1999, as a result of the Polish local government reforms passed in 1998. Its administrative seat is the city of Zielona Góra, although the city is not part of the county (it constitutes a separate city county).

As of 2019 its total population is 75,626. The most populated towns are Sulechów with 16,831 inhabitants and Nowogród Bobrzański with 5,165 inhabitants.

Neighbouring counties
Apart from the city of Zielona Góra, Zielona Góra County is also bordered by Świebodzin County to the north, Nowy Tomyśl County to the north-east, Wolsztyn County to the east, Nowa Sól County to the south-east, Żagań County to the south, Żary County to the south-west and Krosno Odrzańskie County to the west.

Administrative division
The county is subdivided into 9 gminas (five urban-rural and four rural). These are listed in the following table, in descending order of population.

Climate

References

 
Land counties of Lubusz Voivodeship